Sadok may refer to:

 Sadok, a variant of the name Zadoc
Omrane Sadok, Tunisian boxer
Sadok, Kuyavian-Pomeranian Voivodeship, a village in the administrative district of Gmina Chodecz, within Włocławek County, Kuyavian-Pomeranian Voivodeship, in north-central Poland.
 Sadok, another name for the Salakot, a Filipino traditional headgear